Naked Food is a quarterly magazine focusing on whole-food plant-based nutrition. It features health information, nutrition and food related news, recipes, interviews, events, and product, book, and film reviews.

It was founded as a digital publication in 2012 by Margarita Restrepo, and transitioned to a printed publication in the spring of 2014. The name stands for "new American kind and enlightened diet." The magazine is published in the United States, and distributed through bookstores and health-food stores in the U.S. .and Canada.

Advisory board and contributors 
 T. Colin Campbell 
 Caldwell Esselstyn
 Michael Greger 
 David L. Katz
 Michael Klaper
 Doug Lisle
 John A. McDougall 
 John Robbins
 Del Sroufe 
 Will Tuttle
 John Westerdahl

See also 
 List of vegan media

External links 
  of Naked Food Magazine

References 

2012 establishments in Florida
Lifestyle magazines published in the United States
Quarterly magazines published in the United States
Food and drink magazines
Magazines established in 2012
Magazines published in Florida
Vegetarian publications and websites
Plant-based diets